The 2013 Copa Venezuela was the 44th staging of the Copa Venezuela. The winner qualified for the 2014 Copa Sudamericana.

First round
Teams entering this round: 8 teams from Venezuelan Segunda División.
First legs: August 14; Second legs: August 21.

|-
!colspan=5|Central & Oriental Group

|-
!colspan=5|Occidental Group

|}

Second round
Teams entering this round: 16 teams from Venezuelan Primera División, 8 teams from Venezuelan Segunda División.
First legs: August 28, September 4; Second legs: September 7, 8.

|-
!colspan=5|Central & Oriental Group

|-
!colspan=5|Occidental Group

|}

Round of 16
Teams entering this round: Deportivo Anzoátegui (2012 Copa Venezuela champion), Zamora FC (2012–13 Venezuelan Primera División champion).
First legs: September 18; Second legs: October 2, 3.

|-
!colspan=5|Central & Oriental Group

|-
!colspan=5|Occidental Group

|}

Quarterfinals
First legs: October 13; Second legs: October 23.

|-
!colspan=5|Central & Oriental Group

|-
!colspan=5|Occidental Group

|}

Semifinals
First legs: October 30; Second legs: November 6.

|-
!colspan=5|Central & Oriental Group

|-
!colspan=5|Occidental Group

|}

Final
First leg: November 27; Second leg: December 5.

|}

References

External links
Official website of the Venezuelan Football Federation 
Copa Venezuela 2013, Soccerway.com

Copa Venezuela
Venezuela
2013–14 in Venezuelan football